Garmanab (گرمناب) was a village in Khoda Afarin County which was abandoned by the turn of the 20th century. In late nineteenth and early twentieth century the village was inhabited by Armenians, who later emigrated to Armenia or Tabriz. Just before World War II, Reza Qoli Khan, a prominent member of ruling clan of Mohammad Khanlu tribe, acquired the ownership of the village. Shia Muslims and the followers of Yarsan religion settled in the village. Reza Qoli Khan was perished during the brief reign of Azerbaijan People's Government, following which some of Mohammad Khanlus migrated to Qareh Tikanlu.

The village was by the year 2000 the village was deserted. At the 2006 census, its existence was not noted. Since 2005, some expatriates, particularly the grandchildren of Reza Qoli Khan and Hossein Khan—the landlord of Abbasabad—have constructed summer residences in the meadows of the former village. The new village is among the most modern and beautiful villages of Arasbaran region and has the potential of becoming a tourist destination.

There is a holy shrine in the skirts of a mountain outside of the village, where people of neighboring villages used to slaughter sacrificial animals.

References 

Populated places in Khoda Afarin County
Former populated places in East Azerbaijan Province